Pekka Heino may refer to:

 Pekka Heino (television presenter) (born 1961), Sweden television host and presenter
 Pekka Heino (singer) (born 1976), Finnish metal singer